Heijo Maru (Japanese: 平壌丸) was an auxiliary gunboat of the Imperial Japanese Navy during World War II. The vessel was initially constructed as a  merchant ship in 1940, the ship was requisitioned in 1941 and remained in service until September 1943, when she was sunk by torpedoes while on convoy duty in the Solomon Islands.

History
Heijo Maru was laid down as a Standard Peacetime Type C merchant ship by shipbuilder Uraga Senkyo on 29 August, 1939, and was launched on 19 July 1940. In 28 November, 1941, she was requisitioned by the Imperial Japanese Navy and converted to an auxiliary gunboat.

References

1940 ships
Ships built by Uraga Dock Company
Maritime incidents in September 1943
Ships sunk by American submarines